Jean-Paul Proust (3 March 1940 – 8 April 2010) was a French and Monegasque civil servant. He served as the Minister of State of Monaco.

Early life
Jean-Paul Proust was born on 3 March 1940 in Vaas, Sarthe, France. He graduated from the École Nationale d'Administration.

Career
He was a long-time member of the French civil service. He served as Prefect of Guadeloupe from November 1989 to July 1991 and as the chief of police of Paris from 2001 to 6 December 2004.

Likewise, he then served as the Monégasque Minister of State, a post equivalent to Prime Minister. As such, he had the honor of administering Prince Albert II his oath of office as Sovereign Prince of Monaco.  He held that position from 1 June 2005 to 29 March 2010, having been appointed three months earlier by the prince and the French government. 

He was made a Grand Officer of the Order of Saint-Charles (25 March 2010). He was the head of government of Monaco until 2010.

Death
He died on 8 April 2010 at the age of 70.

References

External links
Jean-Paul Proust's obituary 

1940 births
2010 deaths
École nationale d'administration alumni
Prefects of police of Paris
History of Guadeloupe
Prefects of France
Prefects of Guadeloupe
Ministers of State of Monaco
Grand Officers of the Order of Saint-Charles